Asadollah Alam (24 July 1919 – 14 April 1978) was an Iranian politician who was prime minister during the Shah's regime from 1962 to 1964. He was also minister of Royal Court, president of Pahlavi University and governor of Sistan and Baluchestan Province.

Early life
Alam was born on 24 July 1919 in Birjand and was educated at a British school in Iran. By a royal order from Reza Shah, Alam married Malektaj, the daughter of Qavam Al-Molk Shirazi. The son of Qavam ol-molk was then married to a sister of the Shah, Ashraf Pahlavi. Shortly after deposing the Qajar dynasty, Reza Shah intended to unite Iran's non-Qajar nobility through inter-marriage.

At the age of 26, he was appointed governor of Sistan and Baluchestan Province. At the age of 29, he became Minister of Agriculture in the cabinet of Mohammad Sa'ed. He early displayed what an American acquaintance describes as a combination of native toughness and Y.M.C.A. dedication.

Assadollah Alam became the main landowner of Birjand after his father's death. He was one of Iran's first big landowners to distribute his holdings to the peasants, insisting that his servants eat the same food as his family. Once, when a would-be assassin was nabbed outside his door, Alam gave the man $40, then had him thrashed and sent into the street without his pants. Amir Asadollah Alam was the longest serving minister of the Pahlavi era. The title amir (also transliterated "emir") is Arabic for ruler or governor. The name Alam means a banner or a flag in Arabic. Alam's father Amir Ebrahim Alam (AKA Shokat ol-molk) was the governor of the region of Qa'enaat. In the era of Reza Shah Pahlavi he was the Minister of Telecommunications.

Premiership

In 1953, Alam helped organize the coup (also known as the CIA and MI6 backed Operation Ajax) that overthrew Dr. Mohammad Mossadegh. Alam was subsequently made the director of the Pahlavi Foundation, a charitable trust worth at least $133 million, set up by the Shah to finance social-welfare plans out of the profits from royal holdings in banks, industries, hotels. In 1962, he became prime minister at the age of 43.

As prime minister, Assadollah Alam pledged to undertake "an anticorruption campaign with great diligence and all severity." Though the cynical snickered, Alam got free rein from the Shah, and carefully began building airtight cases against suspected grafters among Iran's leading bureaucrats and government leaders. His first major target was General Mohammed Ali Khazai, the Iranian army's chief of ordnance, who had parlayed his $6,000 salary into three houses in the suburbs of Tehran, four apartment houses in France, five automobiles, $100,000 in European banks and $200,000 in cash. A military court convicted Khazai of taking a cut out of government contracts and sentenced him to five years of solitary confinement.

In May 1963, Alam's anti-corruption drive was in full swing. In Tehran, a military tribunal sentenced General Abdullah Hedayat, Iran's first four-star general and once a close advisor of the Shah, to two years in prison for embezzling money on military housing contracts, brushed aside his plea for appeal with the brusque explanation that "more charges are pending." The former boss of the Tehran Electricity Board was in solitary confinement for five years; cases were in preparation against an ex-war minister and twelve other generals for graft.

Riots of 1963
The most important event in Alam's premiership were the riots that took place in June 1963 in response to some of the reforms enforced by the Shah and Alam. It was the clerics who triggered the riots during the Muharram holy days. As the faithful jammed the mosques, the clerics assailed "illegal" Cabinet decisions and urged their followers to "protect your religion". Small-scale riots, led by Ruhollah Khomeini, quickly broke out in the clerical capital of Qum and in several other cities. Police struck back, arrested Khomeini and some 15 other ringleaders. With that, both sides declared open war and the battle was on.

Screaming "Down with the Shah", 10,000 people, swept through the capital, carrying pictures of Khomeini. Though the whereabouts of the Shah was kept secret, rows of white-helmeted troops, backed by tanks, immediately sealed off access to royal palaces in the city and suburbs. In the heart of town green, they fired for 40 minutes. When the mobs entered government buildings, the troops opened up at point-blank range. The crowd fell back in confusion, regrouped, and raced down main avenues.

Nearly 7,000 troops were called out by Alam's government to restore peace, albeit an uneasy one, in Tehran; by then damage was estimated in the millions, at least 1,000 were injured, and the officially reported death toll was 86. It was undoubtedly higher, but since the public cemetery was closed and under heavy guard to prevent further clashes at gravesides, the real number remained unknown. In his memoirs, Alam notes the number of the dead to be about 200, saying that he immediately arranged for their families to receive a pension from the government. For the first time in a decade, martial law was imposed on the city, along with a dusk-to-dawn curfew. Hoping to preserve quiet for a while, Alam also announced that troops would remain on emergency duty. Their orders: shoot to kill.

Minister of the Royal Court

In 1964, he was appointed as chancellor of Shiraz University and a few years later served host to the King of Belgium in his visit to Fars Province. Beginning in December 1966 he was the minister of court for many years. Furthermore, he was the head and bursar of the Pahlavi Foundation. He was also a supporter of the campaign of Richard Nixon, during the United States presidential elections.

As the minister of the Royal Court he was the closest man to Shah Mohammad Reza Pahlavi, who now ran the country autocratically. Therefore, Alam became the channel through which most of the daily affairs of the country passed. Alam's memoirs, published posthumously, are exceptionally detailed documents on the life and the deeds of the Shah as perceived by an insider.

List of positions held

As written by Alam himself in his memoirs in 1972.
 Manager of Imam Reza's shrine in Mashad, AKA "Aastaan-e Qods-e Razavi"
 The Shah's inspector of all universities
 Chairman of the board of trustees of the Pahlavi University
 Chairman of the board of trustees of the Aryamehr University
 Chairman of the board of trustees of the Pars School for Higher Education (Madreseye Aalyi-e Pars)
 The Shah's special liaison with foreign ambassadors (for issues too confidential to pass through the Foreign Ministry)
 Head of the board of trustees of the Mashad University
 Indispensable member of the board of trustees of the University of Tehran
 Indispensable member of the board of trustees of the University of Tabriz
 Chairman of the Royal Horse Institute (Crown Prince Reza Pahlavi was the honorary head)
 Chairman of the royal institute of the Rural Culture Houses (Crown Prince Reza Pahlavi was the honorary head)
 Chairman of the National Scouts Committee
 Head of Kaanun-e Kaar (Labor Institute)
 Deputy chairman of the Red Lion and Sun Society (Princess Shams Pahlavi was the head)
 Chairman of the Council for Support of Mothers and Infants
 Deputy chairman of the Kaanun-e Parvaresh-e Fekri-e Kudakaan va nojavaanaan (Institute for the Intellectual Development of Children and Young Adults) Empress Farah Pahlavi was the head)
 Direct chief of the Legion of Service to Humanity
 Person in charge of the construction in the island of Kish
 Head of the board of trustees of the Pahlavi Foundation
 Deputy chairman of the Iranian Culture Foundation (for research and publication of classic Persian texts)
 In charge of the Shah's personal and monetary affairs
 Minister of court
 Cooperation in establishing University of Birjand

Illness and death

Asadollah Alam was diagnosed with cancer in the late 1960s. He died at New York University Hospital in New York City in 1978, less than a year before the Revolution in Iran.

See also
Pahlavi dynasty
List of prime ministers of Iran

References

Further reading
Asadollah Alam, Diaries of Asadollah Alam: Vol I, 1347-1348/1968-1969, Ibex Publishers, 1993, .
Asadollah Alam, Diaries of Asadollah Alam: Vol II, 1349, 1351/1971, 1972, Ibex Publishers, 1993, .
Asadollah Alam, Diaries of Asadollah Alam: Vol III, 1352/1973, Ibex Publishers, 1995, .
Asadollah Alam, Diaries of Asadollah Alam: Vol IV, 1353/1974, Ibex Publishers, 2000, .
Asadollah Alam, Diaries of Asadollah Alam: Vol V, 1954/1975, Ibex Publishers, 2003, .
Asadollah Alam, Diaries of Asadollah Alam: Vol VI, 1355-1356/1976-1977, Ibex Publishers, 2007, .
Asadollah Alam, Diaries of Asadollah Alam: Vol VII, 1346-1347/1967-1968, Ibex Publishers, 2014, .

External links

Harvard's Iranian Oral History Project: Fatemeh Pakravan
Alam's bio on BBC Persian

Iranian governors
Prime Ministers of Iran
People from Birjand
1919 births
1978 deaths
Scouting in Iran
Iranian Arab politicians
Grand Cross of the Order of Civil Merit
Rastakhiz Party politicians
Grand Crosses 1st class of the Order of Merit of the Federal Republic of Germany
Iranian memoirists
People's Party (Iran) Secretaries-General
20th-century memoirists
Governors of Sistan and Baluchestan Province
Interior Ministers of Iran
Burials at Imam Reza Shrine